The  is a group of archaeological sites in the town of Kamiichi, Toyama Prefecture in the Hokuriku region of Japan. It has been collectively protected as a National Historic Site since 1981.

Outline
The National Historic Site designation encompasses three discontinuous but related areas within Kamiichi at the foot of Mount Tateyama which contain the ruins of a Buddhist temple, a cemetery, and a sutra mound built from the end of the Heian period through the Kamakura period, which are noteworthy both for their size but also for the quality of excavated items. The sites are located about 15 minutes by car from Kamiichi Station on the Toyama Chiho Railway Main Line; however, there are no public facilities.

Ennenjiyama Sutra Mound
The  is actually a cluster of 24 sutra mounds, making it the latest such cluster yet discovered in the Hokuriku region. The sutra containers include Suzu ware and ceramics imported from China during the early Kamakura period and also include a number of Shingon Buddhism ritual implements from the late Heian through Kamakura periods.

Kurokawa Ueyama Cemetery site
The  was in use from the end of the Heian period through the middle of the Kamakura period. Located on a hillside, some 67 densely-packed graves containing cremated remains have been discovered.

Shingō-ji
This site was found to contain the foundations of  monumental gate, pagoda, Hondō and a pond in a configuration which is in accord with what is known of the Shingon-sect temple of Shingō-ji in historical records.

See also

List of Historic Sites of Japan (Toyama)

References

External links
Kamiichi Town official site 
Cultural Properties of Toyama Prefecture 

Heian period
Kamakura period
History of Toyama Prefecture
Kamiichi, Toyama
Historic Sites of Japan
Archaeological sites in Japan
Etchū Province